Long House may refer to:

Long house, a type of building

Places in the United States (by state)

Web Long House and Motel, Hardy, Arkansas, listed on the NRHP in Sharp County, Arkansas
Samuel C. Long House, Tempe, Arizona, listed on the NRHP in Maricopa County, Arizona
Long-Waterman House, San Diego, California, listed on the NRHP in San Diego County, California
Haskell-Long House, Middleburg, Florida
 Long House (Opa-Locka, Florida)
Crawford W. Long Childhood Home, Danielsville, Georgia, listed on the NRHP in Madison County, Georgia
Jerolaman-Long House, Logansport, Indiana, listed on the NRHP in Cass County, Indiana
J.G. and Regina Long House, Monroe, Iowa, listed on the NRHP in Jasper County, Iowa
Chester I. Long House, Wichita, Kansas, listed on the NRHP in Sedgwick County, Kansas
Long-Briggs House, Russellville, Kentucky, listed on the NRHP in Logan County, Kentucky
D. T. Long House, Scotts Station, Kentucky, listed on the NRHP in Shelby County, Kentucky
Huey P. Long Mansion, New Orleans, Louisiana
Huey P. Long House (Forest Ave., Shreveport, Louisiana)
Huey P. Long House (Laurel St., Shreveport, Louisiana)
George Parker Long House, Winnfield, Louisiana, listed on the NRHP in Winn Parish, Louisiana
William Long Log House, Crestwood, Missouri, listed on the NRHP in St. Louis County, Missouri
R.A. Long House, Kansas City, Missouri
 Long House (Kalispell, Montana), listed on the NRHP in Flathead County, Montana
William H. Long Memorial, Hopkinton, New Hampshire, listed on the NRHP in Merrimack County, New Hampshire
James A. and Laura Thompson Long House, Roxboro, North Carolina, listed on the NRHP in Person County, North Carolina
Alexander Long House, Spencer, North Carolina, listed on the NRHP in Rowan County, North Carolina
William H. Long House, Greenville, North Carolina, listed on the NRHP in Pitt County, North Carolina
Long, McCorkle and Murray Houses, Newton, North Carolina, listed on the NRHP in Catawba County, North Carolina
Long-Mueller House, Kettering, Ohio, listed on the NRHP in Montgomery County, Ohio
Long-Romspert House, Oakwood, Ohio, listed on the NRHP in Montgomery County, Ohio
A. G. Long House, Portland, Oregon
Joiner-Long House, Cleburne, Texas, listed on the NRHP in Johnson County, Texas